Dārziņi is a neighbourhood of Riga, the capital of Latvia, which is located in the Latgale Suburb. The neighbourhood mostly consists of summer homes and small plant gardens for personal use, and it is the southernmost neighbourhood of Riga.

Dārziņi were added to the city of Riga in 1968.

Neighbourhoods in Riga